Haman (also known as Haman the Agagite or Haman the evil) is the main antagonist in the Book of Esther, who according to the Hebrew Bible was an official in the court of the Persian empire under King Ahasuerus, commonly identified as Xerxes I (died 465 BCE) but traditionally equated with Artaxerxes I or Artaxerxes II. As his epithet Agagite indicates, Haman was a descendant of Agag, the king of the Amalekites. Some commentators interpret this descent to be symbolic, due to his similar personality.

Etymology and meaning of the name
The name has been equated with the Persian name Omanes recorded by Greek historians. Several etymologies have been proposed for it: it has been associated with the Persian word , meaning "illustrious" (naming dictionaries typically list it as meaning "magnificent"); with the sacred drink Haoma; or with the Persian name Vohuman, meaning "good thoughts". The 19th-century Bible critic Jensen associated it with the Elamite god Humban, a view dismissed by later scholars. Ahriman, a Zoroastrian spirit of destruction, has also been proposed as an etymon. Hoschander suggests that Haman is a priestly title and not a proper name.

Haman in the Hebrew Bible 

As described in the Book of Esther, Haman was the son of Hammedatha the Agagite. After Haman was appointed the principal minister of the king Ahasuerus, all of the king's servants were required to bow down to Haman, but Mordechai refused to. Angered by this, and knowing of Mordechai's Jewish nationality, Haman convinced Ahasuerus to allow him to have all of the Jews in the Persian empire killed.

The plot was foiled by Queen Esther, the king's recent wife, who was herself a Jew. Esther invited Haman and the king to two banquets. In the second banquet, she informed the king that Haman was plotting to kill her (and the other Jews). This enraged the king, who was further angered when (after leaving the room briefly and returning) he discovered Haman had fallen on Esther's couch, intending to beg mercy from Esther, but which the king interpreted as a sexual advance.

On the king's orders, Haman was hanged from the 50-cubit-high gallows that had originally been built by Haman himself, on the advice of his wife Zeresh, in order to hang Mordecai. The bodies of Haman's ten sons were also hanged, after they died in battle against the Jews. The Jews also killed about 75,000 of their enemies in self-defense.

The apparent purpose of this unusually high gallows can be understood from the geography of Shushan: Haman's house (where the pole was located) was likely in the city of Susa (a flat area), while the royal citadel and palace were located on a mound about 15 meters higher than the city. Such a tall pole would have allowed Haman to observe Mordecai's corpse while dining in the royal palace, had his plans worked as intended.

Haman in other sources

Midrash 

According to Ḥanan b. Rava, his mother was ʾĂmatlaʾy, a descendant of ʿÔrebtî (also ʿÔrǝbtāʾ she-raven), apparently patriarch of a major Nehardean house.

TgEsth1 and TgEsth3 call him "Haman the son of Hamedatha, descended from Agag the son of Amaleq." The Targum Sheni gives Haman's lineage as follows: "Haman the son of Hammedatha the Agagite, son of  Khada, son of Kuza, son of Alipilot, son of Dios, son of Diosos, son of Peros, son of Ma'dan, son of Bala'qan, son of Antimiros, son of Hadrus, son of Shegar, son of Negar, son of Parmashta, son of Vaizatha, son of Agag, son of Sumqar, son of Amalek, son of a concubine of Eliphaz the son of Esau". There are apparently several generations omitted between Agag, who was executed by Samuel the prophet in the time of King Saul, and Amalek, who lived several hundred years earlier. According to the Midrash Abba Gorion, Haman was also called Memucan, because he was "destined for punishment".

In Rabbinic tradition, Haman is considered to be an archetype of evil and persecutor of the Jews. Having attempted to exterminate the Jews of Persia, and rendering himself thereby their worst enemy, Haman naturally became the center of many Talmudic legends. Being at one time extremely poor, he sold himself as a slave to Mordecai. He was a barber at Kefar Karzum for the space of twenty-two years. Haman had an idolatrous image embroidered on his garments, so that those who bowed to him at command of the king bowed also to the image.

Haman was also an astrologer, and when he was about to fix the time for the genocide of the Jews he first cast lots to ascertain which was the most auspicious day of the week for that purpose. Each day, however, proved to be under some influence favorable to the Jews. He then sought to fix the month, but found that the same was true of each month; thus, Nisan was favorable to the Jews because of the Passover sacrifice; Iyyar, because of the small Passover. But when he arrived at Adar he found that its zodiacal sign was Pisces, and he said, "Now I shall be able to swallow them as fish which swallow one another" (Esther Rabbah 7; Targum Sheni 3).

Haman had 365 counselors, but the advice of none was so good as that of his wife, Zeresh. She induced Haman to build a gallows for Mordechai, assuring him that this was the only way in which he would be able to prevail over his enemy, for hitherto the just had always been rescued from every other kind of death. As God foresaw that Haman himself would be hanged on the gallows, he asked which tree would volunteer to serve as the instrument of death. Each tree, declaring that it was used for some holy purpose, objected to being soiled by the unclean body of Haman. Only the thorn-tree could find no excuse, and therefore offered itself for a gallows (Esther Rabbah 9; Midrash Abba Gorion 7 (ed. Buber, Wilna, 1886); in Targum Sheni this is narrated somewhat differently).

According to the Targum Sheni, he killed the prophet Daniel, who managed to live to Ahasuerus's reign (Targum Sheini on Esther, 4, 11).

Quran 

In the Qur'an (Islam's primary scripture), Haman is not a proper name, but a title of the court official and high priest of the pharaoh, and is associated with him in his court at the time of prophet, Moses. McAuliffe's Encyclopaedia of the Qurʾān among other sources relates "Haman" to be the Arabized form of "Ha-Amana" in Egyptian. This is in line with Persian historical records which do not contain any reference to the biblical story of a Persian official named Haman during that time period nor the person of Esther. However, some scholars disagree on this historical records conclusion.

Haman appears six times throughout the Qur'an four times with Pharaoh and twice by himself, where God (Allah) sent Moses to invite Pharaoh, Haman, and their people to monotheism, and to seek protection of the Israelites whom Haman and Pharaoh were tormenting. Referring to Moses as a sorcerer and a liar, the Pharaoh rejected Moses' call to worship the God of Moses and refused to free the Israelite children. The Pharaoh commissioned Haman to build a tall tower using burnt bricks so that the Pharaoh could ascend and see the God of Moses. The Pharaoh, Haman, and their army in chariots pursuing Israel's fleeing children drowned in the Red Sea as the parted water closed on them. The Pharaoh's submission to God at the moment of death and total destruction was rejected, but his corpse was saved as a lesson for posterity and he was mummified.

Josephus 
Josephus mentions Haman in his Antiquities of the Jews. Josephus's account of the story draws from the Septuagint translation of the Book of Esther and from other Greek and Jewish sources, some no longer extant.

Septuagint
The LXX calls Haman a "Macedonian" by Xerxes (see Esther 16:10). Scholars have had two different explanations for this naming:

 Macedonian was used to replace the word "Mede", and emphasises this when he also says that no Persian blood existed in him. (In practice the Persians and the Medes co-ruled an empire, but great friction existed between them.)
 Another opinion is that Xerxes called him a Macedonian Spy, due to his insistence on causing civil war within Persia between the Jews and the Persians.

The Septuagint translates the "hang" of Esther 7:9–10 as "crucify" or "impale", using the same verb later used in the New Testament's Gospel of Matthew. The fifty-cubit apparatus used in the execution is described ambiguously using a word which could mean a tree, a club, a stave, a gibbet, a gallows, the vertical component of a cross for crucifixion, or anything made of wood, an ambiguity already present in the original.

Vulgate 

As in the Septuagint, Haman's execution is ambiguous, suggestive of both hanging and crucifixion. The fifty-cubit object, described as xylon in the Septuagint, is similarly ambiguously referred to as "wood". In the corner of the Sistine Chapel ceiling is a depiction in fresco of the execution of Haman by Michelangelo; Haman is shown crucified in a manner similar to typical Catholic depictions of the crucifixion of Jesus, though the legs are parted and the apparatus resembles a natural tree shorter than fifty cubits high.

English translations
Translations of the Book of Esther'''s description of Haman's execution have variously treated the subject. Wycliffe's Bible referred both to a tre (tree) and a iebat (gibbet), while Coverdale's preferred galowe (gallows). The Geneva Bible used tree but the King James Version established gallows and hang as the most common rendering; the Douay–Rheims Bible later used gibbet. Young's Literal Translation used tree and hang.

 As a god 
Jacob Hoschander has argued that the name of Haman and that of his father Hamedatha are mentioned by Strabo as Omanus and Anadatus, worshipped with Anahita in the city of Zela. Hoschander suggests that Haman may, if the connection is correct, be a priestly title and not a proper name. Strabo's names are unattested in Persian texts as gods; however the Talmud and Josephus interpret the description of courtiers bowing to Haman in Esther 3:2  as worship. (Other scholars assume "Omanus" refers to Vohu Mana.)

 Purim traditions 

The Jewish holiday of Purim commemorates the story of the Jews' deliverance and Haman's defeat. On that day, the Book of Esther is publicly read and much noise and tumult is raised at every mention of Haman's name. Various noisemakers (graggers) are used to express disdain for Haman by "blotting out" his name during the recitation of Megillah.

In literature and popular culture
 Dante's Divine Comedy 
Haman at the moment of his execution appears at the beginning of Canto 17 of Purgatorio in Dante's Divina Commedia. The image occurs in the form of a spontaneous vision given to the character of Dante-as-pilgrim, the purpose of which is to envision Haman's accusers, Ahaseurus, Esther and Mordecai, as emblems of righteous anger. In this divinely inspired hallucination, the fictional Dante sees Haman as "un crucifisso", a man who undergoes crucifixion. 

 Novels 
Margaret Mitchell's novel, Gone With the Wind (1936) references Haman in the scene in which Rhett Butler, in jail, faces the prospect of hanging.

The Agatha Christie novel, The Mysterious Affair at Styles references Haman in a scene where Poirot, investigating a murder, says he will "hang him as high as Haman".

 Visual media 
Haman is featured as the primary antagonist in the South Park episode "Jewbilee" (1999) where he is portrayed as attempting to re-enter the mortal world in order to rule once more over the Jews. He is also characterised as evil vizier to a sultan in the "Aliyah-Din" segment of the television animation Scooby-Doo! in Arabian Nights (1994). The character of Haman has also been depicted in the American feature film One Night with the King (2006), played by James Callis. 

American children's television animations in which the biblical story of Haman is told include the "Queen Esther" episode of the series The Greatest Adventure: Stories from the Bible (1985-1992), where he is voiced by Werner Klemperer, and the computer-generated series VeggieTales'' (2000), in which he is portrayed by "Mr. Lunt" during the episode "Esther, the Girl who Became Queen".

References

Notes

Citations

External links

Biblical murderers
Book of Esther
Esther
Hebrew Bible people
Amalek